"Big Barn Bed" is a song by Paul McCartney and Wings from the band's 1973 album Red Rose Speedway. The songwriting credits are attributed to Paul McCartney and Linda McCartney.

Background
Like the Red Rose Speedway tracks "Get On the Right Thing" and "Little Lamb Dragonfly", "Big Barn Bed" was a leftover from the McCartneys' solo career. The song dates back to 1971, with the opening lines of the track constituting the coda to the "Ram On" reprise on the McCartneys' album Ram. However, during the recording sessions for Red Rose Speedway, the song was recorded by the band for the new album. "Big Barn Bed" was originally intended to be the opening track of the double-LP version of Red Rose Speedway, but although the final album was cut down to a single disc, the song remained the album's opener.

A live version of "Big Barn Bed" was also included as the opening track in the James Paul McCartney television special, broadcast on 10 May 1973. Throughout the performance of the song, a brief description of each member of the band was displayed on screen.

Lyrics and music
According to music professor Vincent Benitez, "Big Barn Bed" has a freer structure than most of Paul McCartney's songs.  He finds the lyrics to seem more like the words were just "strung together" rather than formed into a coherent whole.  The lyrics involve big barn beds and leaping armadillos.  The song is in the key of F major.  Beatle historian Bruce Spizer described the song as "a pleasant-sounding mid-tempo rocker."

Reception
In a contemporary review for Rolling Stone, Lenny Kaye described the track as "captur[ing] McCartney's current approach as well as any", saying, "Neither verse nor chorus are anything much, but the song draws you slowly in with the same steady roll of traction demonstrated by that odd union of records which score heavily in the discotheque markets, reaching its peak with the endless repetitions of the chorus line in the end." AllMusic editor Stephen Thomas Erlewine includes "Big Barn Bed" among "the greatest songs" on Red Rose Speedway, but labels the track as "slight". Guitar World contributor Damien Faneilli rated it as one of McCartney's 15 best "under-the-radar" post-Beatle songs, praising its simplicity, harmonies, acoustic guitars and "weird but fun lyrics". Author John Blaney considered "Big Barn Bed" to be "little more than an underdeveloped fragment that went nowhere".  Ultimate Classic Rock critic Dave Swanson rated "Big Barn Bed" as McCartney's 4th most underrated song, saying that it starts Red Rose Speedway "in wonderful fashion" and that "A seductive rhythm lures in the listener and the echo-laden vocals keep you hooked as a catchy-as-can-be chorus ices the cake."  

Wings' lead guitarist Henry McCullough included a version of "Big Barn Bed" on his 2011 solo album Unfinished Business.

Personnel
 Paul McCartney – vocals, bass guitar, piano
 Linda McCartney – backing vocals
 Denny Laine – backing vocals, acoustic guitar
 Henry McCullough – backing vocals, electric guitar
 Denny Seiwell – drums

References

External links
Lyrics from Paul McCartney's official site

1973 songs
Paul McCartney songs
Paul McCartney and Wings songs
Songs written by Paul McCartney
Song recordings produced by Paul McCartney
Songs written by Linda McCartney
Music published by MPL Music Publishing